Ayen is a commune in the Corrèze department in the Nouvelle-Aquitaine region of central France.

The inhabitants of the commune are known as Ayennois or Ayennoises.

The commune has been awarded two flowers by the National Council of Towns and Villages in Bloom in the Competition of cities and villages in Bloom.

Geography

Ayen is located some 20 km north-west of Brive-la-Gaillarde and 7 km west of Objat. Access to the commune is by road D5 from Saint-Robert in the west which passes through the village and continues south-east to join the D901. The D39 comes from Perpezac-le-Blanc in the south and passes through the village before continuing north to Juillac. The D17 from Rosiers-de-Juillac in the north-west passes through the north of the commune and continues south-west to join the D901. The D95 goes south-west from the village to Louignac and the D2 goes south to Cublac. The D140 goes north-east from the village to Vars-sur-Roseix. Apart from the village there are the hamlets of Ayen Bas to the west of the village; Laval, Soulet, and Leyfourchie in the north of the commune; and Graschamp, Le Temple, Les Chaumonts, and Les Charnie in the south. The commune is mixed forest and farmland.

The Roseix river forms the northern border of the commune as it flows east by south-east to join the Loyre south of Objat. The Elle rises in the south of the commune and flows west then south forming the western border before it continues south to join the Corrèze west of Terrasson-Lavilledieu. Other unnamed streams rise in the commune and flow northwards to join the Roseix.

Neighbouring communes and villages

History
Ayen is a former county which was created as a duchy in February 1737 for Louis de Noailles.

One of the largest commanderies of the Knights of Malta in the region was in the commune at the Temple of Ayen.

In 1137 Ayen, as with all of Aquitaine, joined the kingdom of France through the marriage of Eleanor and Louis VII but, after the divorce from Eleanor, it came under English rule.

After two turbulent centuries during which the Limousin barons indulged in incessant wars, the English reoccupied Malemort and Ayen whose chateau was occupied notably by Richard the Lion Heart.

In 1415 the Brivistes supported by King Charles VI destroyed the Chateau of Malemort. The English survivors took refuge in the chateau at Ayen. The following year the peasants of the village laid siege to the chateau. After 17 days of blockade, overcome by hunger and thirst, the English surrendered. To prevent the fortress from falling into the hands of their enemies Jean I of Comborn, future chamberlain of Charles VII, received the mission to raze the Chateau of Ayen.

Ayen was one of the stages of a route from Segur which was known by Richard the Lion-Heart. There are still remnants of the passage of his troops through Pompadour, Juillac, Ayen, and Noailles. Richard ended his life killed at the Siege of Chalus in 1199.

Heraldry

Administration

List of Successive Mayors

Demography
In 2017 the commune had 714 inhabitants.

Culture and heritage

Civil heritage
The panoramic view from the ramparts of Upper Ayen.
The old village at Bas Ayen
The Fountain called  L'Homme qui crache

Religious heritage

The Parish Church of Saint Madeleine contains many items that are registered as historical objects:
33 door hinges and 2 door handles (14th century)
A set of 6 Tombs embedded in the walls (14th century)
A Tomb embedded in the wall (14th century)
A Tomb embedded in the wall (14th century)
A Tomb embedded in the wall (14th century)
A Tomb embedded in the wall (14th century)
A Tomb embedded in the wall (14th century)
A Tomb embedded in the wall (14th century)
A Bronze Bell (1604)

The embedded tombs (enfeus in French) were reinstalled in the new church after the destruction of the old church in 1894.

Sights
 Arboretum de la Tuillère

See also
Communes of the Corrèze department

Bibliography
Ayen in Lower Limousin and Les Noailles during the Revolution, Maurice Cassan, 1989, R. Dessagne, 279 pages 
The Duchy of Ayen and Les Noailles, a land of Limousin, Maurice Cassan, 1987, R. Dessagne, 245 pages 
Short History of the Church of Ayen, Maurice Cassan, 1986

Notes

References

External links

Ayen official website 
The Green Station of Ayen 
Ayen on the 1750 Cassini Map

Communes of Corrèze